Khanewal District (Urdu and ) is a district of the Punjab province of Pakistan. According to the 1998 census of Pakistan, the district had a population of 2,068,490, of which 17.42% were urban. Khanewal is located at 30°18'0N 71°55'0E with an altitude of 128 metres.

Administrative divisions
For the purpose of administration, District Khanewal is divided into 4 tehsils i.e. Khanewal, Mian Channu, Jahanian and Kabirwala and 168 union councils including 114 rural and 54 urban whose elected representatives formulate Zilla and Tehsil councils. Political constituencies include 4 national seats and 7 provincial seats of legislative assemblies. The district contains four tehsils which are as following:

 Khanewal Tehsil
 Mian Channu Tehsil
 Kabirwala Tehsil
 Jahanian Tehsil

Geography

This district is situated in the center of the country at an almost equal distance from Karachi and Peshawar and on the main routes of the railway and the Grand Trunk Road. The district is bounded on the north by Jhang District and Toba Tek Singh District; on the south by Vehari District; on the east by Sahiwal District and on the west by Multan.

Climate

Demographics
At the time of the 2017 census the district had a population of 2,920,233, of which 1,482,668 were males and 1,437,272 females. Rural population is 2,333,801 while the urban population is 586,432. The literacy rate was 58.59%. Muslims were the predominant religious community with 98.26% of the population while Christians were 1.69% of the population.

At the time of the 2017 census, 73.41% of the population spoke Punjabi, 18.55% Saraiki, 6.47% Urdu and 1.16% Pashto as their first language.

According to the census of 1998, Punjabi is the most widely spoken first language, accounting for % of the population. Urdu was the native language of 7.8% (although almost all of the inhabitants of the district use it as a second language), Saraiki is native to 5.8% and Pashto – to 1.1%.

The main tribes and clans include: Niazi Afghans, Seoul, Daduana, Kamboh, Matyana, Gujjar, Doltana, Sahu, Rajputs (Rana), Rajpoot Dhudhi, Awan, Sheikh, Jatt, Bucha, Nikyana Sial, Siyal, Arain, Bhati, Baloch, Khokhars Mayo Solgi (jutt) and toru.

Education 
The education system in Khanewal district is formulated along specific modern, religious, cultural, social, psychological, commerce and scientific injunctions. The current literacy rate of district is 39.9%. The standard national system of education is mainly inspired from the British system. The system also aims to imbibe a secular outlook among the students with the awareness of the rich cultural heritage of Pakistan. Khanewal district has a wide range of schools, colleges and universities that caters to diverse streams.

The system is divided into five levels: primary (grades one through five); middle (grades six through eight); high (grades nine and ten, leading to the Secondary School Certificate); intermediate (grades eleven and twelve, leading to a Higher Secondary School Certificate); and university programs leading to graduate and advanced degrees.

Khanewal district, like majority of the districts in Pakistan has both public and private educational institutions from primary to university level. Most educational institutions are gender based from primary to university level.

All academic education institutions are the responsibility of the provincial governments. The federal government mostly assists in curriculum development, accreditation and some financing of research.

Notable people

Maulana Tariq Jameel, Islamic Scholar
Syed Fakhar Imam, Ex. Speaker National Assembly of Pakistan
Syed Hussain Jahania Gardeziis a Pakistani politician, who is currently serving as 'Provincial Minister of Punjab for Management and Professional Development
Ghulam Haider Wyne, Ex. Chief Minister of Punjab
Brig Muhammad Yaqoob Ilahi, Remount Veterinary and Farms Corps, Pakistan Army
Tasawar Hayat, Pakistani scientist.
Har Gobind Khorana, Indian American Nobel Prize winner for Medicine.

Villages 
 

Chak 138/10-R

See also 
 Khanewal
 Khanewal Tehsil
 Khanewal Junction railway station

References

 
Districts of Punjab, Pakistan